The Buccaneer can refer to:

Plays and film
 The Buccaneer (1925 play), an unsuccessful play by Maxwell Anderson about the famous pirate Henry Morgan
 The Buccaneer (1938 film), a Cecil B. DeMille film about another notorious pirate, Jean Lafitte, starring Fredric March
 The Buccaneer, an audio adaption on the 1938 film by Lux Radio Theatre starring Clark Gable.
 The Buccaneer (1958 film), a remake of the 1938 film, starring Yul Brynner

Places
The Buccaneer (Christiansted, U.S. Virgin Islands), hotel on National Registry of the Historic Hotels of America

See also
 The Buccaneers (film), a short silent comedy film directed by Robert F. McGowan.